Börstorp is a manor house located at Börstorpsviken, a gulf of Sweden's largest lake Vänern.

The estate is known to have existed since the 14th century. Börstorp became a manor in 1625. The main stone building was built by Conrad Falkenberg and completed in 1646. It was later rebuilt in neo-Gothic inspiration in the 1850s by Carl Leuhusen according to the drawings of architect  Hjalmar Wijnblad.

References

External links
Börstorp Slott website

Manor houses in Sweden
Buildings and structures in Västra Götaland County